Ashin (also Romanized as ʿAshīn) is an ancient village over 1700-year of history in Anarak District, Nain County, Isfahan Province, Iran. Ashin and its public bath were registered as a National Heritage site at June 2014 by an architect, Mozhgan Bagheri .

Ashin is a strategic village on the way of Silk Road with a brilliant architect designed for desert which left behind after migration of the residents about 1974.

Ashin is in the brother of the central desert (Markazi Desert), located at 250 km north-east of Isfahan (1380 m above sea level), 120 km north-west of Naein and 50 km north-west of Anarak; in the middle of ancient and old mines in Iran. Ashin is famous among adventurous travelers and dessert lovers who known desert specially Rig-e Jen Desert and is full of natural surprises..

At the 2006 census, its existence was noted, but its population was not reported.

References 

Populated places in Nain County